Michael Troy Worth (born January 13, 1965) is an American actor, martial artist, screenwriter, and director.

Early life
Born in Philadelphia in 1965, Worth is from German and Delaware Indian Native American heritage. As a child, he grew up near the Chesapeake Bay before moving to Northern California with his parents. At the age of 11, he directed his first film titled The Tire with a super 8mm camera he had spent his allowance on. He continued making short films and experimental video projects during his youth including The Toad Warriors and The Berkeley Junk Food Massacre.

Career 
Sometime later, he moved to Los Angeles, and earned a handful of bit parts in film and television including Pacific Blue and Alien Nation. He lived with his dog in his truck for six months in Venice, California while trying to save money. Surviving on odd jobs and construction work, Worth accepted small parts and worked as a martial arts trainer for George Lazenby.

His first leading role was in the independent action film Final Impact. Variety magazine labeled him a "promising newcomer". Signed to several films with PM Entertainment, he worked through a series of low-budget films before landing the role of "Tommy" on the TV series Acapulco H.E.A.T.. He was also one of the front-runners for the role of Robin in Batman Forever, although the role ultimately went to Chris O'Donnell. Worth ended up having a cameo alongside O'Donnell in one of the film's fight scenes. He also appeared in "The Storytellers" alongside Tippi Hedren.

In 2004, he wrote and directed a micro-budget experimental film, titled Killing Cupid. It earned him a Best Director nomination at the Action On Film Film Festival in 2005 as well as "Best Fiction Film" at the "Hollywood Documentary and Fiction Film Festival" in 2006. He continued to act in a variety of small independent films while honing his skills as a filmmaker, ghostwriting for film and television, as well as directing second unit. Worth wrote the screenplays for and starred in the psychological thriller/western film Dual (2005) and the sci-fi/horror film Devil On The Mountain (2006). He also appeared in an episode of the CBS sitcom The King of Queens in 2005.

Filmography

Film

Television

External links

References 

1968 births
Living people
Male actors from Philadelphia
Film directors from Pennsylvania